École supérieure d'ingénieurs des travaux de la construction de Metz (ESITC Metz) a French engineering College.

The School has been created in 1992 by Marcel Poinsignon at the request of construction companies.

Located in Metz, the ESITC Metz is a private higher education institution of general interest recognised by the State. The school is a member of the Union of Independent Grandes Écoles (UGEI).

References

External links
 ESITC Metz

Engineering universities and colleges in France
ESITC Metz
Metz
Educational institutions established in 1992
1992 establishments in France